The 1937 UCLA Bruins football team was an American football team that represented the University of California, Los Angeles during the 1937 college football season.  In their 13th year under head coach William H. Spaulding, the Bruins compiled a 2–6–1 record (1–5–1 conference) and finished in ninth place in the Pacific Coast Conference.

Schedule

References

UCLA
UCLA Bruins football seasons
UCLA Bruins football